Visa requirements for Gabonese citizens are administrative entry restrictions by the authorities of other states placed on citizens of the Gabon. As of 2 July 2019, Gabonese citizens had visa-free or visa on arrival access to 54 countries and territories, ranking the Gabonese passport 89th in terms of travel freedom (tied with passports from Guinea, Rwanda, Senegal and Togo) according to the Henley Passport Index.

Visa requirements map

Visa requirements

Dependent, Disputed, or Restricted territories
Unrecognized or partially recognized countries

Dependent and autonomous territories

See also

Visa policy of Gabon
Gabonese passport

References and Notes
References

Notes

Gabon
Foreign relations of Gabon